Leopold Park is a public park of  located within the Leopold Quarter (European Quarter) of Brussels, Belgium. It is adjacent to the Paul-Henri Spaak building, the seat of the European Parliament. It is served by the metro stations Maalbeek/Maelbeek and Schuman on lines 1 and 5 of the Brussels Metro.

The outstanding feature of the park is its pond, fed by the Maelbeek stream. Many rare trees (remnants of a botanic garden) and animals such as mallards, moorhens, coots, and even Egyptian geese and rose-ringed parakeets thrive in this urban environment.

History
The Eggevoorde Estate had dominated the Maelbeek valley in Brussels since the Middle Ages, but portions had been sold off in the following centuries. In 1851, a portion was sold off in exchange for shares in the Zoological and Horticultural Society, and the area became what is today Leopold Park. The park was intended to be a home for scientific and leisure activities. Horticultural gardens and a zoo were created along with a community hall, a reading room, and a café-restaurant. However, the zoo was poorly managed and the management company went bankrupt in 1876. The horticultural gardens, on the other hand, were quite successfully managed by Jean Jules Linden, and they became a commercial and scientific success story until 1898, when they were sold. The City of Brussels bought the old zoological gardens and converted them into a public recreational park containing a variety of diversions, including the current Museum of Natural Sciences.

In 1884, Ernest Solvay and Paul Héger, professors at the Université libre de Bruxelles (ULB), began a project to create an expanded university campus in the park. Several of the university's new institutes were created there, and stand to this day, including the original site of the Solvay Institute of Sociology, as well as its sister institution, the Solvay Institute of Physiology, which was completed in 1894. It was in that building that the famous Fifth Solvay Conference on Physics and on Chemistry took place in October 1927.

During the following years, a campus for the Solvay School of Commerce was established but construction of additional buildings was soon curtailed for fear of encroachment on the park and its fragile wildlife. In 1930, the Lycée Émile Jacqmain secondary school moved into the former Institute of Physiology. These buildings have remained to this day but only one still belongs to Solvay (and houses the Solvay Conference).

Buildings
Leopold Park contains a number of historic buildings such as the Pasteur Institute, the former Solvay School of Commerce, the Solvay Institute of Sociology, and the Solvay Institute of Physiology, as well as the former Solvay Library, which houses the Security & Defence Agenda, Friends of Europe and Maisons de l'Europe think tanks.

Most of the buildings were converted into offices for the European institutions in the 1980s. The former Institute of Physiology now houses the Lycée Émile Jacqmain. In 2017, the House of European History, a history museum, opened in the refurbished Eastman Dental Hospital. The building of the Royal Belgian Institute of Natural Sciences is also located in the park.

Remarkable trees

Below are some of the park's remarkable trees listed by the Monuments and Sites Commission:

See also

 List of parks and gardens in Brussels

References

Notes

External links

 Description of Leopold Park at the Belgian Board of Tourism website

Parks in Brussels
Urban public parks
City of Brussels
European quarter of Brussels
1880 establishments in Belgium